Jeral Skelton (born 8 April 1999) is an Australian professional rugby league footballer who plays as a  for the Canterbury-Bankstown Bulldogs in the NRL.

Skelton played his junior rugby for Wests Rugby and played rugby sevens for the Australia national rugby sevens team between 2017 and 2020, before switching to the 15-man code, joining the Melbourne Rebels in 2020, who he would play for until 2022.

Super Rugby statistics

Reference list

External links
Rugby.com.au profile
itsrugby.co.uk profile

1999 births
Living people
Australian rugby league players
Australian rugby sevens players
Australian rugby union players
Australian sportspeople of Samoan descent
Canterbury-Bankstown Bulldogs players
Rugby league centres
Rugby union flankers
Rugby union centres
Melbourne Rebels players